Margaret Christensen  (8 January 1921 – 30 November 2009) also credited as Margaret Caristensen and Peg Christensen, was an Australian radio hostess and character actress, who appeared in numerous TV series, primarily in guesting roles.

Biography

She started her radio career in the 1940s, hosting both comedy and dramas, and appeared in radio series Blue Hills as Emmie Lawson. She began with movie acting in the 1950s. She appeared in several TV series like Skippy, Division 4, Homicide, A Country Practice and All Saints.

Christensen was the mother of actor Sean Scully.

Filmography

References

External links 
 

1921 births
2009 deaths
Australian film actresses
Recipients of the Medal of the Order of Australia
Actresses from Adelaide